Interleukin-7 receptor subunit alpha (IL7R-α) also known as CD127 (Cluster of Differentiation 127) is a protein that in humans is encoded by the IL7R gene.

IL7R-α is a type I cytokine receptor and is a subunit of the functional Interleukin-7 receptor and Thymic Stromal Lymphopoietin (TSLP) receptors.

References

Further reading

External links
 
 
 

Type I cytokine receptors
Clusters of differentiation